Old Stittsville  is a community in Ontario. It is the old part of the suburban community of Stittsville in Ottawa.

References

Neighbourhoods in Ottawa